Anita Stansfield (born July 20, 1961) is an American Latter-day Saint romance novelist.  She is the LDS market's best-selling romance novelist, with sales of nearly half a million.

Stansfield was born in Provo, Utah.  She currently lives in Alpine, Utah with her husband and five children.

She has published many novels since her first publication in 1994, as well as a collection of personal essays, most of which are oriented toward Latter-day Saint readers.  Many of her works have been published by Covenant Communications in American Fork, Utah, although she now self-publishes through her own company, Crosswalk Books.  She is also an occasional public speaker at local events for LDS women as well as firesides for young men and young women.

Stansfield is a former president of the Utah Valley Chapter of the League of Utah Writers.  She has also won the Independent LDS Booksellers' "Best Fiction Award" for her first published book, First Love and Forever. She has also won the League of Utah Writers' "Golden Quill" award multiple times, as well as Covenant Communications' 1997 special award for "Pioneering New Ground in LDS Fiction."  In 2007, she won the Lifetime Achievement award from the Whitney Awards program.

References

External links 
 Official site
 
 

1961 births
Living people
20th-century American novelists
21st-century American novelists
American Latter Day Saint writers
American romantic fiction writers
People from Alpine, Utah
Writers from Provo, Utah
American women novelists
Women romantic fiction writers
20th-century American women writers
21st-century American women writers
20th-century American essayists
21st-century American essayists
Novelists from Utah
Latter Day Saints from Utah
American women essayists